Laurens (Languedocien: Laurenç) is a commune in the Hérault département in the Occitanie region in southern France.

Winemaking
Laurens is one of the seven communes which produces Faugères AOC wine.

Population

See also
Communes of the Hérault department

References

Communes of Hérault